Younger Hall is the main music venue in St Andrews, Scotland. Its concert hall seats 1000 people, and hosts performances by the University of St Andrews Symphony Orchestra, the Scottish Chamber Orchestra, as well as chamber music concerts and masterclasses by various artists, weekly Wednesday lunchtime concerts, and jazz nights.

History
Younger Hall was designed by English architect Paul Waterhouse as the graduation hall for the University of St Andrews, and built in 1923–29. Its design combines aspects of Neo-Classical and Art Deco styles. It was built at a cost of £90,000 and was opened by Elizabeth, the Duchess of York, later Queen Elizabeth The Queen Mother. The hall was the gift of Dr James and Mrs Annie Younger, who lived nearby at Mount Melville.

Its foyer is decorated with grey and green marble. The principal hall has two levels of balcony and a wood-panelled stage. There is a two-manual organ built by Harrison & Harrison of Durham. Younger Hall is the home of The Music Centre of the University of St Andrews, which makes the use of eleven practice, teaching and rehearsal rooms, and a Music Technology Studio, all located within the building.

References

Historic buildings and structures in Scotland
Art Deco architecture in Scotland
Neoclassicism
University of St Andrews